Designed by Aurelio Lampredi, the Fiat 124 engine first appeared in the all-new Fiat 124 in April 1966. The in-line four-cylinder engine comprised an iron block with an aluminium cylinder-head with pushrod actuated valves. The belt-driven design was ahead of its time when introduced. European production of the petrol versions ended with the Fiat 131 in 1984, but later diesel derivatives continued to be built until 1999. It did have a longer life in its twin-cam iteration, which continued in production until 2000. While originally of an overhead valve design, an overhead cam version was added to the facelifted 131 in 1981. There were also three SOHC diesel iterations of 1.4, 1.7, and 1.9 litres. The last versions of this engine to be built were the diesels. The  direct-injected diesel version was the first direct-injection diesel to appear in a production passenger car, the Fiat Croma Turbo D i.d.

Engine specifications
The Fiat 124 series engine was produced in a number of configurations differing in stroke and bore but maintaining a standard bore-spacing. A larger  version arrived in October 1968, in the 124 Special. This has an  bore. A variety of other bores and strokes were available. Several of the Brazilian Fiasa engines share their bore and stroke with the 124 series engines and were sometimes used in the same cars, but the engines are not related.

The 1.3 was later bored out by 0.1 mm, to nudge the displacement above 1.3 liters.

The 124-series engine has five main bearings, a cast iron block and a reverse-flow aluminum alloy head. Intake and exhaust are both located on the right-hand side of the engine. 

There are also overhead camshaft versions of the 124-series engine. The first was the Fiat Twin Cam, which used the 124-series block with some modifications to use a DOHC valvetrain with a crossflow head. The Italian single overhead cam version arrived in 1981 and formed the basis for the three diesel versions.

The  diesel was available in turbocharged guise in the Uno Turbo D, while the larger 1.9-litre version was also available with direct injection. 

There was also a two-litre pushrod version (6132 AZ 2000) for the 1974 to 1982 Fiat Nuova Campagnola; this has the  bore of the 1.6 but combined with a  stroke.

{|
|+ Valid engine bore/stroke combinations
|

Applications
List of vehicles using variations of the Fiat 124-series engine (incomplete).

Fiat
OHV
 Fiat 124: 1966-1974
 Fiat 131 Mirafiori: 1974-1981 (longer for the Weekend/Estate)
 Fiat 238: 1966-1976 (CR 7.7 Normale, CR 9.2 Super)
 Abarth 1300 Scorpione: 1969-1971

SOHC
 Fiat 131 Mirafiori: 1981-1984
 Fiat Croma: 1985-1991

Diesel engine
 Fiat Uno: 1986-1995 (Europe)
 Fiat Ritmo: 1985-1988
 Fiat Regata: 1984-1990
 Fiat Fiorino: 1988-1999
 Fiat Duna: 1987-1991
 Fiat Ducato: 1987-1999
 Fiat Croma: 1988-1997
 Fiat Tipo: 1988-1995
 Fiat Tempra: 1990-1997
 Fiat Bravo/Brava: 1995-1997
 Lancia Delta: 1986-1991
 Lancia Prisma: 1984-1989
 Lancia Dedra: 1989-1999

SEAT
OHV
 SEAT 131 Mirafiori
 SEAT Ritmo: 1980-1983
 SEAT Ronda: 1982-1984

Footnotes

SOHC
Straight-four engines
Gasoline engines by model